South Okanagan General Hospital is a hospital operating under the governance of Interior Health. It is located in the town of Oliver, British Columbia, Canada, on 7139 362 Avenue.

It was founded in 1973 as a replacement for the St. Martin's Hospital. The hospital has obtained $CAN200,000 for emergency care, also having lost a number of beds at the hospital needed for patients. It operates an emergency service.

See also 

 List of hospitals in Canada

References

External links 
 

Hospital buildings completed in 1973
Regional District of Okanagan-Similkameen
Hospitals in the Okanagan
Hospitals in British Columbia